Poble Sec is a station of the Barcelona Metro network located in the neighbourhood of the same name, in the district of Sants-Montjuïc, Barcelona. It is served by L3 (green line), and was previously known as Parlamento.

The station is located directly under Avinguda del Paral·lel between Carrer de Manso and Carrer del Parlament. It can be accessed from entrances in Carrer de Manso and Carrer de Teodor Bonaplata.

The station opened in 1975, along with the other stations of the section of L3 between Paral·lel and Sants Estació stations. This section was originally operated separately from L3 and known as L3b. The station adopted its current name in 1982 at about the same time that L3b was merged with L3 proper.

Future plans are for L2, which currently terminates one stop down the L3 at  Paral·lel station, to be diverted into new platforms at Poble Sec. L2 will then continue to a terminus at Barcelona Airport, and Poble Sec will become an interchange station between L2 and L3.

See also
List of Barcelona Metro stations

References

External links

Trenscat.com

Barcelona Metro line 2 stations
Barcelona Metro line 3 stations
Railway stations in Spain opened in 1975
Transport in Sants-Montjuïc